Kebayoran Lama is a district of South Jakarta, Indonesia. The rough boundaries of Kebayoran Lama are: Kebayoran Lama Road – Palmerah Barat Road to the north, Grogol River to the east, Jakarat Outer Ring Road to the south, and Pesanggrahan River to the west.

Kebayoran Lama contains some green areas of moderate size, some of this area are concentrated within the Tanah Kusir Cemetery, famous for being a burial place of Mohammad Hatta, the first vice president of Indonesia.

Pondok Indah is an upscale residential area located in Kebayoran Lama.

Toponym
Kebayoran Lama consists of the word Kebayoran (Betawi for kabayuran, meaning "stockpiles of bayur wood (Pterospermum javanicum)") and Lama (Indonesian for "old"). Several stockpiles of timber (including bayur wood) were built there in earlier time. Bayur wood is known for its strength and resistance to termite attack.

History
During the colonial era, Kebayoran was a kawedanan (an administrative area below a Regency, above a Subdistrict), headed by a wedana. Kebayoran Kawedanan was part of the Meester Cornelis Regency, whose area also included Ciputat.

Around 1938, an airport was planned in the area by the government of Dutch East Indies, but was cancelled because of World War II. This undeveloped area was later, after the independence period, developed into the Kebayoran Baru District, while the rest of the area becomes the Kebayoran Lama District.

In 1990, part of Kebayoran Lama District was made into Pesanggrahan District.

Administrative villages
The district of Kebayoran Lama is divided into six kelurahan or administrative villages:
Grogol Utara – area code 12210
Grogol Selatan – area code 12220
Cipulir – area code 12230
Kebayoran Lama Utara – area code 12240
Kebayoran Lama Selatan – area code 12240
Pondok Pinang – area code 12310

List of important places

 Kebayoran Lama Market
 Kebayoran Lama Station
 Pondok Indah Golf and Country Club
 Pondok Indah Grand Mosque
 Pondok Indah Mall
 Tanah Kusir Cemetery
 Gandaria City

References

Districts of Jakarta
South Jakarta